Mathias Christen (born 18 August 1987) is a Liechtensteiner former international footballer who played as a midfielder.

Career
Born in Vaduz, Christen has played club football in Switzerland, Liechtenstein and Thailand for FC Triesen, FC Balzers, FC Wil,  FC Gossau, FC Vaduz, FC Linth 04, USV Eschen/Mauren, Singhtarua and FC Triesenberg.

He made his international debut for Liechtenstein in 2008, and he has appeared in FIFA World Cup qualifying matches for them. He scored his first international goal against Bosnia and Herzegovina during the 2014 FIFA World Cup qualifying campaign.

Career statistics

International goals

References

1987 births
Living people
Liechtenstein footballers
Liechtenstein international footballers
Liechtenstein expatriate footballers
Association football midfielders
FC Wil players
FC Gossau players
FC Vaduz players
USV Eschen/Mauren players
Mathias Christen
FC Chur 97 players
FC Balzers players
FC Triesen players
Swiss Challenge League players
Liechtenstein expatriate sportspeople in Switzerland
Liechtenstein expatriate sportspeople in Thailand
Expatriate footballers in Switzerland
Expatriate footballers in Thailand
People from Vaduz